These are the official results of the Women's 100m Hurdles at the 1996 Summer Olympics in Atlanta, Georgia. There were a total of 44 competitors.

Medalists

Results

Heats

Quarterfinals

Semi finals

Final

See also
Men's 110m Hurdles
Women's 400m Hurdles

References

External links
 Official Report
 Results

H
Sprint hurdles at the Olympics
1996 in women's athletics
Women's events at the 1996 Summer Olympics